Roberta Metsola (née Tedesco Triccas; born 18 January 1979) is a Maltese politician serving as President of the European Parliament since January 2022.

Metsola was first elected to as a Member of the European Parliament (MEP) in 2013, and became the First Vice-President of the European Parliament in November 2020. Following the death of the incumbent President David Sassoli, Metsola was elected as President of the European Parliament on 18 January 2022, becoming the youngest ever President, the first Maltese person to hold the office, and the first female President since 2002.

Biography 

The Tedesco Triccas family stems from Swieqi near St. Julian's, Malta, and Roberta grew up with her father Geoffrey (son of Emmanuel Tedesco and Helen Triccas Dimech), her mother Rita (daughter of Carmelo Bezzina and Francesca Briffa) and her two sisters Ann and Lisa in Gżira. She studied at St Joseph School in Sliema, St Aloysius' College sixth form, and she graduated in law from the University of Malta in 2003  and obtained a diploma in European studies from the College of Europe in Bruges in 2004.

Roberta Tedesco Triccas and her Finnish husband Ukko Metsola (National Coalition Party) met in 1999 and married in Rabat, Malta, on 1 October 2005. Together, they have four sons: Luca Matias (born 2007), Alec Emil (born 2008), Marc (born 2012) and Kristian (born 2016). They both ran for the 2009 European Parliament election, becoming the first married couple to run in the same European Parliament election from two different member states.

Metsola has been active since youth within Malta's Partit Nazzjonalista (PN), serving within the party's international secretariat and volunteering with the PN's election arm ELCOM. In her student years, Metsola formed part of the SDM (Studenti Demokristjani Maltin), KNZ (The National Youth Council) and MŻPN (Moviment Żgħażagħ Partit Nazzjonalista), before being elected as Secretary General of the European Democrat Students (EDS), the student branch of the EPP, as well as to posts within the European Youth Forum (YFJ).

In 2002, at 23 years, she was elected as one of the two vice-presidents of the executive board of the Youth Convention on the Future of Europe, and the following year she actively campaigned with the PN for a Yes vote in the 2003 EU membership referendum.

Following her engagement in the EU referendum campaign, 25-year-old Metsola was encouraged by Malta's Prime Minister Lawrence Gonzi to run for the 2004 European elections as a candidate for the Nationalist Party. She was not elected.

In October 2004 Metsola joined the Permanent Representation of Malta to the European Union in Brussels, headed by Richard Cachia Caruana, where she worked for 8 years as legal and judicial cooperation attaché, also participating for Malta in the negotiations of the Lisbon Treaty and working on files such as the set-up of the European Asylum Support Office in Malta.

She ran again for the 2009 European elections, without being elected.

In 2013-2014 Metsola briefly served as legal advisor to the High Representative of the Union for Foreign Affairs and Security Policy, Catherine Ashton.

Member of the European Parliament 

On 24 April 2013 Metsola successfully contested the casual election to fill the vacated seat of Simon Busuttil, becoming one of Malta's first female Members of the European Parliament. In the Parliament, she sits as a member of the European People's Party Group (EPP).

Following her re-election at the 2014 elections, Metsola was elected as a vice-chair of the Committee on Petitions (PETI) in July 2014. In addition, she served as a member of a number of committees and delegations. She also joined the parliamentary intergroup on children's rights. Metsola was further re-elected at the 2019 elections; in this legislature she has followed closely the party line, voting together with the EPP delegation in over 90% of the cases.

In 2014 Metsola led the EPP representation in the Committee on Civil Liberties, Justice and Home Affairs (LIBE) in the work on the non-binding EU roadmap against homophobia and discrimination on grounds of sexual orientation and gender identity, whose rapporteur was Green MEP Ulrike Lunacek. She was also the parliament's rapporteur on the European Border and Coastguard Regulation in 2019 and was co-rapporteur on an anti-SLAPP report in 2021.

Metsola also co-authored a non-binding report on the European migrant crisis in 2016, aimed at establishing a "binding and mandatory legislative approach" on resettlement and new EU-wide "readmission" agreements which should take precedence over bilateral ones between EU and non-EU countries.

From 2016 until 2017, Metsola was part of the Parliament's Committee of Inquiry into Money Laundering, Tax Avoidance and Tax Evasion (PANA) that investigated the Panama Papers revelations and tax avoidance schemes more broadly.

Within LIBE, where she chaired the EPP representation between January 2017 and 2020, she has been part of the Rule of Law Monitoring Group (ROLMG) since 2018.

In 2019, during the controversies following the murder of Daphne Caruana Galizia, she famously refused to shake hands with Malta's Prime Minister Joseph Muscat at a meeting with the Members of European Parliament from Malta. "If he thinks he can try to brush off responsibility he is sorely mistaken. Get out now, before you do irreparable damage to the country", she wrote.
In 2020 Metsola considered contesting the leadership of Partit Nazzjonalista, but finally decided against it. "Some ceilings need a few more cracks before they can be smashed through", she stated. The post was later filled by Bernard Grech.

In October 2020, in the discussion in LIBE on a parliamentary resolution on "the rule of law and fundamental rights in Bulgaria", Metsola tabled amendments on behalf of the EPP which were widely interpreted as shielding Bulgaria's EPP government from criticism, including by proposing to remove references to Venice Commission findings and to the misuse of EU funds and high-level corruption allegations directly involving Prime Minister Boyko Borisov. Other amendments, which she later withdrew, also alleged that a gambling boss had been financing the street protest movement. This caused outrage in Bulgaria, leading to Metsola's social media accounts being flooded by protest messages, including threats and misogyny. The EPP amendments were finally defeated, and the resolution was adopted as it had been originally proposed.

In November 2020, Metsola was elected as First Vice-President of the European Parliament, replacing Mairead McGuinness, who had become European Commissioner. She was the first Maltese MEP to become a vice-president.

President of the European Parliament 

In November 2021, Metsola was chosen as EPP candidate to succeed David Sassoli as President of the European Parliament on the expiry of his term as president in January 2022. Sassoli had been hospitalised with pneumonia in September 2021 and in December announced that he would not seek a second term as president, making Metsola his likely successor. Following further hospitalisation, Sassoli died on 11 January 2022, one week before the end of his term. On Sassoli's death, Metsola became the acting President of the European Parliament.

On 18 January 2022, on her 43rd birthday, Metsola was elected President of the European Parliament for a two-and-a-half-year term. She was elected in the first round of voting, receiving an absolute majority of 458 votes out of the 690 cast. As the candidate of the EPP, she was also supported by the S&D and Renew Europe parliamentary groups, after the three groups reached an agreement on the election of the President and the vice-presidents and legislative priorities for the second half of the Parliament's term. On her election, Metsola became the youngest ever President, the first Maltese person to hold the office, and the first woman President since 2002 (and only third woman president ever). The subject made a statement days after being present as Belgian police searched the residence of Greek MEP Eva Kaili in the widening investigation of members of the European parliament over alleged corruption, money laundering and other offenses in relation to possible schemes of Qatar, Morocco, NGOs and the FIFA World Cup.

Anti-abortion views 
Metsola had consistently voted for anti-abortion resolutions, and from the beginning of her tenure, she faced questions over her opposition to abortion, which is legal in every EU member state, except Malta and Poland. She once said in a 2015 statement that she was "categorically against abortion." On her election as President of the European Parliament, she stated that during her tenure, she will represent the Parliament's position, which recognises safe access to abortion as a human right.

Metsola has called for strengthening the powers of the European Parliament.

Other activities
 Wilfried Martens Centre for European Studies, Member of the Executive Board
 Friends of Europe, Member of the Board of Trustees (since 2020)

Honours
 
  Recipient of the First Class of the Order of Princess Olga

References

External links

 
 

1979 births
Living people
People from St. Julian's, Malta
Presidents of the European Parliament
MEPs for Malta 2009–2014
MEPs for Malta 2014–2019
MEPs for Malta 2019–2024
Nationalist Party (Malta) MEPs
Women MEPs for Malta
University of Malta alumni
20th-century Maltese women
21st-century Maltese lawyers
21st-century Maltese women politicians
21st-century Maltese politicians
Articles containing video clips